The 2016 Seongnam FC season is the club's twenty-eighth consecutive season in K League Classic since its establishment in 1989 as Ilhwa Chunma Football Club and the third season in its current name, Seongnam FC. The team will also competing in the 2016 Korean FA Cup.

Squad

Out on loan & military service

Competitions

Overview

{| class="wikitable" style="text-align: center"
|-
!rowspan=2|Competition
!colspan=8|Record
|-
!
!
!
!
!
!
!
!
|-
| K League Classic

|-
| KFA Cup

|-
! Total

K League Classic

Regular season

After Split

2016 K League Promotion-Relegation Playoffs

''Seongnam FC relegated to 2017 K League Challenge, due to 1:1 on aggregate with Away goals rule.

Results summary

Korean FA Cup

External links 
 Official Website 
Official K League website 
Official K League Website 

1
Seongnam FC seasons